Falkirk is a county constituency of the House of Commons of the Parliament of the United Kingdom.  It was created for the 2005 general election, replacing Falkirk West and part of Falkirk East. 

It can be considered a safe SNP seat: at the 2015 general election, it was the seat with the largest majority for the SNP as well as the seat with the largest majority for any party in Scotland. At the 2019 general election it again had the highest numerical majority of any SNP-won seat in Scotland, although other seats had higher relative majorities.

Constituency profile
The constituency takes in the town of the same name and stretches west to include Denny, Stenhousemuir and Banknock.

Boundaries

Falkirk has been joined by most of the various sized towns and villages of its council area in this new seat, including Airth, Bainsford, Banknock, Bonnybridge, Brightons, Camelon Carronshore, Denny, Falkirk, Glen Village/Hallglen, Head of Muir, Larbert, Laurieston, Polmont, Redding, Shieldhill, Stenhousemuir, Tamfourhill, and Westquarter. A south eastern arm of the seat curls around Grangemouth. The seat sits to the south of the River Forth.

History

2013 Labour selection irregularities 

The Labour Party leadership was embroiled in a row with the Unite the Union over the selection of a candidate to replace disgraced former Labour MP Eric Joyce. In 2013, local officials of Unite, led by Len McCluskey, were accused of abusing membership procedures by "bulk-buying" and "packing" the Falkirk Constituency Labour Party with their own members in an attempt to get their preferred candidate, Karie Murphy (Labour election chief Tom Watson's office manager), selected. Unite was alleged to have signed up and paid the subscriptions for over 100 new party members in Falkirk, some of them allegedly unaware they were joining the Labour Party.

A leaked Unite document from December 2012 detailed its activity in Falkirk as "exemplary" for the way in which "we have recruited well over 100 Unite members to the party in a constituency with less than 200 members. 57 came from responses to a text message alone, (followed up face to face). A collective effort locally, but led and inspired by the potential candidate".

On 25 June 2013, Falkirk CLP was placed in "special measures" by the National Executive Committee at an emergency meeting after an internal report found "sufficient evidence for concern about the legitimacy of some new recruits to the Falkirk party." Under Labour's rules, the Central party takes control over a constituency party when in special measures and directly runs the parliamentary selection process. All members who had joined the constituency party in Falkirk after 12 March 2012 (the date Eric Joyce announced he would not stand for re-election) had their memberships suspended. Unite union responded to the NEC's disciplinary measure in a press statement:

“Unite rejects the decisions taken today by the Labour Party in relation to the Falkirk West selection process. It does so on behalf of the many decent trade unionists who have joined the Party in good faith and are now to be denied any say in the choice of their Labour parliamentary candidate. None of the allegations contained in the report of the so-called “investigation” have been put to Unite in clear breach of natural justice. The intervention by Party officials into this process has been driven by Blairite pressure to exclude trade unionists from any influence in the Party, an ambition clearly spelled out by Peter Mandelson last month. Trade unionists will draw their own conclusions regarding the integrity of the Party’s procedures.”

In July, Labour Party Leader Ed Miliband blamed "a few individuals" for vote-rigging in Falkirk, saying: "Instead of defending what happened in Falkirk, Len McCluskey should be facing up to his responsibilities. He should not be defending the machine politics involving bad practice and malpractice that went on there, he should be facing up to it." As the controversy grew, Tom Watson, a former flatmate of McCluskey, resigned on 4 July from the Shadow Cabinet. Unite's favoured candidate Karie Murphy (a close friend of McCluskey) and the Falkirk CLP chairman Stephen Deans (who is also chair of the Unite trade union in Scotland) were also suspended by Labour HQ on the same day. The internal Labour Party investigation report into the matter was handed on 5 July to the Scottish police service. A Labour spokesperson said: "Until yesterday our advice was that there was no evidence of criminality. That changed after the solicitor took a look at it."

Len McCluskey rejected the NEC report's allegations that the Falkirk CLP selection was fixed as "smears" against Unite. He called on Ed Miliband for the internal party report to be published for "everyone to see" and for Miliband to set up an independent inquiry with the credibility to establish the truth. In an article for The Guardian, the sitting MP Eric Joyce called the actions of certain Unite officials in Falkirk as "amateurish, hubristic and irresponsible". The National Executive Committee confirmed it would impose an all women shortlist on the Falkirk CLP.

Members of Parliament
This seat was formed from Falkirk West and much of Falkirk East.

Election results

Elections in the 2010s

Safia Ali was suspended by the Labour Party over allegations that she made anti-Semitic posts on Facebook. Because nominations had closed at the time of her suspension, she still appeared on the ballot paper as the Labour candidate. The fall in the Labour Party's vote share of 18.6% was the worst that the party suffered in Scotland, and the 11th worst in the 630 seats it contested in the United Kingdom, at this election.

This was the largest numerical majority in Scotland at the 2019 general election.

Elections in the 2000s

References 

Westminster Parliamentary constituencies in Scotland
Constituencies of the Parliament of the United Kingdom established in 2005
Politics of Falkirk (council area)
Larbert
Stenhousemuir
Denny, Falkirk